Pamelyn is a given name. Notable people with the name include:

Pamelyn Chee, Singaporean actress and host
Pamelyn Ferdin (born 1959), American actress and animal rights activist

Feminine given names